The Lent Bumps 2014 was a series of rowing races at Cambridge University from Tuesday 25 February 2014 to Saturday 1 March 2014. The event was run as a bumps race and was the 127th set of races in the series of Lent Bumps which have been held annually in late February or early March since 1887. See Lent Bumps for the format of the races. 103 crews took part (57 men's crews and 46 women's crews), with nearly 950 participants in total.

Head of the River crews

  men bumped  on day 1, then rowed over head for the next three days, claiming the Lents headship for the first time since 1998.

  women bumped  on day 2 to reclaim the Lent headship they lost to Downing in 2011.

Highest 2nd VIIIs

 Despite finishing down 2 places,  remained the highest placed men's second VIII.

Links to races in other years

Bumps Charts

Below are the bumps charts for all 4 men's and all 3 women's divisions, with the men's event on the left and women's event on the right. The bumps chart shows the progress of every crew over all four days of the racing. To follow the progress of any particular crew, find the crew's name on the left side of the chart and follow the line to the end-of-the-week finishing position on the right of the chart.

This chart may not be displayed correctly if you are using a large font size on your browser. A simple way to check is to see that the first horizontal bold line, marking the boundary between divisions, lies between positions 17 and 18.

The Getting-on Race

The Getting-on Race allows a number of crews which did not already have a place from last year's races to compete for the right to race this year.

The 2014 Lent Bumps Getting-on Race took place on 21 February 2014.

Competing crews

Men

34 men's crews raced for 17 available spaces at the bottom of the 3rd division, and the top of the 4th division.  The following were successful and rowed in the bumps.

The following were unsuccessful.

Women

16 women's crews raced for 8 available spaces at the bottom of the 3rd division.  The following were successful and rowed in the bumps. The combined Hughes Hall/Lucy Cavendish women's crew is listed as Lucy Cavendish only.

The following were unsuccessful.

References
 Bumps results: Lent Bumps 2014 Men's Division - Cambridge University Combined Boat Clubs (CUCBC)
Bump Results: Lent Bumps 2014 Women's Division - Cambridge University Combined Boat Clubs (CUCBC)
Bump Results: Lent Bumps 2014 Getting-On Race - Cambridge University Combined Boat Clubs (CUCBC)

Lent Bumps
Lent Bumps results
Lent Bumps
Lent Bumps
Lent Bumps